Foreman High School may refer to:

 Foreman High School (Arkansas) - Foreman, Arkansas
 Foreman High School (Chicago) - Chicago, Illinois